Monopera is a genus of flowering plants belonging to the family Plantaginaceae.

Its native range is Brazil.

Species:

Monopera micrantha 
Monopera perennis

References

Plantaginaceae
Plantaginaceae genera